Agamana is a genus of moths of the family Erebidae. The genus was erected by Francis Walker in 1866. These moths are mainly found in the Australian continent and Indian subcontinent. These are not considered very rare, but very little is known about these species.

Species
Agamana aldabrana (Fryer, 1912) Aldabra
Agamana andriai (Viette, 1966) Madagascar
Agamana callixeris (Lower, 1903) Queensland
Agamana cavatalis Walker, [1866] Australia
Agamana conjungens (Walker, 1858)
Agamana delphinensis (Viette, 1966) Madagascar
Agamana ectrogia (Hampson, 1926) Sierra Leone, southern Nigeria, South Africa
Agamana goniosema (Hampson, 1926) Sikkim
Agamana inscripta (Pagenstecher, 1907) Madagascar
Agamana iselaea (Viette, 1958) Madagascar
Agamana pagenstecheri (Viette, 1968) Madagascar
Agamana pentagonalis (Butler, 1894) Kenya, Tanzania, Zambia, South Africa
Agamana pergrata (Turner, 1933) northern Queensland
Agamana sambirano (Viette, 1966) Madagascar
Agamana sarmentosa (Felder & Rogenhofer, 1874) Australia

References

Calpinae
Noctuoidea genera